Angela Kay Kepler (born 1943) is a New Zealand-born naturalist and author.
She is a graduate of the University of Canterbury, New Zealand and has a master's degree from the University of Hawaii and a doctorate from Cornell University, New York in 1972. She also undertook a one-year post doctoral position at Oxford University.

She has conducted research in Hawaii, Alaska, Russia and the Caribbean. Two bird species have been named for her: the elfin-woods warbler (Setophaga angelae),  a Puerto Rican endemic; and the extinct Hawaiian rail Porzana keplerorum.

She has a farm on Maui and grows some 32 different banana varieties.

Bibliography
Publications by Angela Kepler
 The World of Bananas in Hawaii: Then and Now - 2012
 West Maui: A Natural History Guide - 2007
 Haleakala: From Summit to Sea - 2005
 A Pocket Guide To Maui's Hana Highway: A Visitor's Guide - May 2004
 Exotic Tropicals of Hawaii: Heliconias, Gingers, Anthuriums, and Decorative Foliage - 1999
 Hawaiian Heritage Plants - 1998
 Maui's Floral Splendor - 1995
 Haleakala: A Guide to the Mountain - 1992
 Majestic Molokai: A Nature Lover's Guide - 1992
 Sunny South Maui: A Guide to Kihwailea & Makena Including Kahoolawe - 1992
 Trees of Hawai'i - 1991
 Proteas in Hawaii - 1988

References

1943 births
Cornell University alumni
Living people
University of Canterbury alumni
University of Hawaiʻi alumni
New Zealand naturalists
New Zealand non-fiction writers
New Zealand women writers